Nicole Marie Lloyd-Ronning is an American computational astrophysicist specializing in gamma-ray bursts and the deaths of massive stars as a researcher at the Los Alamos National Laboratory and lecturer at University of New Mexico–Los Alamos. She is also known for her work in science popularization, as the author of the book Great Mysteries in Astrophysics, as a scientist ambassador for the Bradbury Science Museum, and in youth outreach programs, especially for young people from indigenous groups in the American

Education and career
Lloyd-Ronning was born in El Paso, Texas and grew up as an army brat in the US and  When she was a high school student in  she discovered her interest in science and  She majored in physics and astronomy at Cornell University, graduating in 1996, and completed a doctorate at  Her 2001 doctoral dissertation, Cosmological and Intrinsic Properties of Gamma-Ray Bursts, was supervised by 

During postdoctoral research at the Canadian Institute for Theoretical Astrophysics, she began working from home and part time after the birth of her first  She became a postdoctoral researcher at the Los Alamos National Laboratory in 2004, but the pressure of balancing her work with raising a family led her to drop out of academia and research for  although she maintained her currency with ongoing research, her connections with a small number of researchers, and her memberships in the academic societies for her 

In 2015, she won an M. Hildred Blewett Fellowship, an award given by the American Physical Society to support women returning to interrupted careers in science.

Outreach
Lloyd-Ronning's interest in science outreach began in her graduate school years, as a Project Astro participant in the Bay Area.  During her career break, she frequently visited schools in Northern New Mexico to run a series of hands-on physics and astronomy activities with K-12 students.  In 2018, she began a collaboration with artist Agnes Chavez through a series of local and worldwide workshops focused on connections between physics, indigenous cosmology, and indigenous art. She has taught through Chavez's STEMArts Lab, which brings science programming to schools and festivals, and is one of the scientist ambassadors at the Los Alamos National Laboratory 

She is the author of Great Mysteries in Astrophysics: A Guide to What We Don't Know (IOP Publishing, 2022), based on a community education course she taught for several years at the University of

Recognition
In 2021, the Los Alamos National Laboratory gave Lloyd-Ronning their inaugural Los Alamos Community Relations Medal, for her efforts in bringing STEM education to underserved and indigenous students in 

In 2022, Lloyd-Ronning was named a Fellow of the American Physical Society (APS), after a nomination from the APS Forum on Diversity and Inclusion, "for the development and work on a broad set of outreach programs introducing STEM science to students from elementary to undergraduate schools and tireless efforts to affect institutional change, working toward a more inclusive, diverse, and equitable STEM work

References

External links

Year of birth missing (living people)
Living people
American astrophysicists
American women physicists
Cornell University alumni
Stanford University alumni
Los Alamos National Laboratory personnel
University of New Mexico faculty
Fellows of the American Physical Society
People from El Paso, Texas